Heraclea Cybistra, or simply Heraclea or Herakleia (Ἡράκλεια), also transliterated as Heracleia,  was a town of ancient Cappadocia or Cilicia; located at the site of modern Ereğli in Konya Province, Turkey. It had some importance in Hellenistic times owing to its position near the point where the road to the Cilician Gates enters the hills. It lay in the way of armies and was more than once sacked by the Arab invaders of Asia Minor (by Harun al-Rashid in 806 and al-Ma'mun in 832).

About 12 km south of Heraclea is the Hittite İvriz relief.

See also 
 List of ancient Greek cities
Cybistra

References

Former populated places in Turkey
Geography of Konya Province
Populated places of the Byzantine Empire
Populated places in ancient Cappadocia
Populated places in ancient Cilicia